The 2020 TCR Japan Touring Car Series was the second season of the TCR Japan Touring Car Series. The series supported the 2020 Super Formula Championship.

Race calendar 
The calendar was announced in 2019 with six confirmed dates with all rounds held in Japan and supporting the Super Formula Championship. A revised calendar was released in July 2020.

Teams and drivers 
All teams and drivers are Japanese-registered

References

External links 

 

TCR Japan Touring Car Series
Japan Touring Car Series